"The Patriotic Song" was the national anthem of Russia from 1991 to 2000. It was previously the regional anthem of the Russian Soviet Federative Socialist Republic from 1990 until 1991 (until 1990 it used the State Anthem of the Soviet Union), when it transformed into the Russian Federation after the dissolution of the Soviet Union. Unlike most national anthems, it had no official lyrics (although unofficial ones written for it were proposed, they were not adopted).

Etymology
 originally was not a song but a composition for piano without lyrics, written by Mikhail Glinka (1804–1857) and titled (in French) «». The song has been known under its current title of "The Patriotic Song" since 1944, after Glinka's composition was arranged for orchestra by composer  under that name, popularizing it and leading it to become synonymous with Glinka's original work itself.

History

"" originally was not a song but a composition for piano without lyrics, written by Mikhail Glinka in 1833 and titled (in French) «». It was often claimed that it was written by Glinka as part of a national anthem contest or with the intent of becoming a national anthem, though evidence for either claim is scant. In 1885, Glinka's manuscript was re-discovered after languishing in obscurity at the Russian National Library in St. Petersburg. In 1944 it was arranged for orchestra by composer  under the title "" and a few years later, poet  set lyrics to Bagrinovsky's arrangement of Glinka's composition for a song dedicated to the Soviet capital of Moscow, both of which helped popularize Glinka's work among the Soviet public and gave it its common contemporary moniker.

The TV news program on USSR Central Television  used it as its theme tune from 1984 to 1986.

In the 1990s, Boris Yeltsin chose the tune as the new state anthem of the Russian SFSR and it was officially adopted as such on 23 November 1990 by the Supreme Soviet of Russia. It remained in de facto usage through inertia by the new Russian Federation from 1991 until its official confirmation as the state's national anthem in 1993 when the Russian constitution was enacted. Also favored by the Russian Orthodox Church, the music went without lyrics for several years. In 1999, Viktor Radugin won a contest to provide suitable words for it with his poem . However, no lyrics and none of the entries were ever adopted.

It reportedly proved to be unpopular with the Russian public and with many politicians and public figures, because of its tune and lack of lyrics, and consequently its inability to inspire Russian athletes during international competitions.

It was replaced soon after Yeltsin's successor as President of the Russian Federation, Vladimir Putin, first took office on 7 May 2000. The federal legislature established and approved the music of the National Anthem of the Soviet Union, with newly written lyrics, in December 2000. Yeltsin criticized Putin for supporting the semi-reintroduction of the Soviet-era national anthem, although some opinion polls showed that many Russians favored this decision.

Today, the song is used by some elements of the Russian opposition as a political anthem. It is also sometimes erroneously played during sporting events involving Russia.

Proposed lyrics

"Be Glorious, Russia!"
It has been confused with the closing chorus of Glinka's opera A Life for the Tsar, possibly due to both beginning with the same word, but the two works are unrelated with the latter being derived from an old Polish folk song (though the operatic music, too, has been suggested as a candidate for a Russian national anthem).

"Above the Fatherland Majestically"
Above the Fatherland Majestically by Vladimir Kalinkin, written in 1998 was another proposed set of lyrics. Performed by honored Russian artist Vladimir Detayov, the Duma was made aware of this piece's existence in April 1999. At the initiative of the Ministry of Ethnic Policy of Russia, this record was first publicly presented at the First Congress of the Assembly of Peoples of Russia. During the summer of that year, it was performed on the radio station "Radio of Russia" and the TV channel "Moskoviya", devoted to writing a text for the national anthem.

In January 2000, it was carried out in a new orchestral arrangement performed by the N.P. Osipov National Academic Orchestra of Folk Instruments and the A.V. Sveshnikov Academic Choir. Overall the song received positive reviews, although like , never attained official status.

See also

 National anthem of Russia (Officially State Anthem of the Russian Federation)
 State Anthem of the Soviet Union

References

External links
Russian national anthems, including the score for Glinka's tune
Russian Anthems Museum, including MP3 recordings of Glinka's anthem with and without words
 Glinka - the author of Russian national anthem in Russian. by K.Kovalev - Eng. Bortniansky's anthem "Kol slaven" - Eng.

Historical national anthems
European anthems
Russian anthems
Compositions by Mikhail Glinka
Russian SFSR
Russian Soviet Federative Socialist Republic
Russian patriotic songs
Articles containing video clips
National anthem compositions in A-flat major